Holei may refer to;

 Ochrosia kilaueaensis, sometimes called holei
 Holei island, an island in the Palmyra Atoll